= Consensus (website) =

- Founded: 1 September 2009
- Dissolved: 1 October 2016
- Founder: Zhou Zhixing
- Website: www.21ccom.net

The Consensus or Consensus Net, also known as 21st Century Web, was a Chinese ideological and cultural website launched on 1 September 2009 by Zhou Zhixing. The website published commentaries and analysis from both left- and right-wing scholars on topics such as economics and culture.

Sponsored by Lide Consensus (Beijing) Network Media Technology Co., Ltd., the position of Consensus leaned toward liberalism.

== History ==
The domain name was registered on February 20, 2009.

Consensus was shut down by government order on October 1, 2016.
